Boy van de Beek (born 13 November 1993) is a Dutch football player who plays for De Treffers.

Club career
He made his professional debut in the Eerste Divisie for Achilles '29 on 7 August 2015 in a game against Jong Ajax.

References

External links
 
 

1993 births
Footballers from Nijmegen
Living people
Dutch footballers
Achilles '29 players
De Treffers players
Eerste Divisie players
Tweede Divisie players
Association football midfielders